A list of films produced in Turkey in 1975 (see 1975 in film):

See also
1975 in Turkey

References

Lists of Turkish films
1975